Rochor is a planning area located within the Central Area of the Central Region of Singapore. Rochor shares boundaries with the following planning areas – Kallang to the north and east, Newton to the west, as well as Museum and the Downtown Core to the south.

Shopping centres

The Verge

The Verge, formerly Tekka Mall, is the first and largest modern shopping centre at Little India in Rochor, Singapore, being opened in 2003. The Verge has two buildings, the main building and Chill @ (The Verge). It is located on the southern part of Little India, with the main building is located on the junction of Serangoon Road and Sungei Road and the Chill @ The Verge is located on the junction of Perak Road and Sungei Road. Both of the buildings are separated by Clive Road and the mall lies opposite of Tekka Centre across Serangoon Road. On 16 July 2008, the mall was revamped, which also brought about the name change from Tekka Mall to The Verge.

Tekka Centre

Tekka Centre is a relatively smaller shopping centre in Little India, Rochor.

On the ground floor is a hawker centre with stalls which sell Indian vegetarian meals, served on banana leaves or on stainless steel platters, besides Chinese vegetarian, North Indian and Malay food.

At the wet market which is on the same level, stalls sell fresh seafood, especially crabs from Sri Lanka, and vegetables. There are also many Chinese stalls selling vegetables that are specially flown in from India.

MRT station
Rochor MRT station is a Mass Rapid Transit station on the Downtown line Stage 2 in Singapore, formerly known as the Bukit Timah line. The station will link the East West line and the North East line along the Bukit Timah corridor, serving the commercial areas to the south of Little India. This station was originally planned to interchange itself but the plan was abandoned.

References

External links
Street directory